James Arnold (2 July 1909 – 7 September 1999) was an English commercial artist who developed a passion for the wagons that he saw on his cycling tours of the countryside in the pre- and post-War years. He set about producing painstakingly accurate measured drawings and watercolours of all the main regional types that he came across and these he included in a series of books beginning with The Joyous Wheel (1940) and including The Farm Waggons of England and Wales (1969).

Life
Arnold was born in Southall, Middlesex on 2 July 1909.

Never owning a car, he cycled all his life, claiming to have covered nearly half a million miles in his lifetime. In November 1946 he became a founding member of the Birmingham-based Beacon Roads Cycling Club.  He often toured with fellow members of the Cyclists' Touring Club (CTC).

In 1961 (1964?) he married fellow cyclist Jeanne (Jeane?) Boore.

James Arnold died in Welland, Worcestershire, on 7 September 1999.

Publications
The Joyous Wheel, Hamish Hamilton, 1940
The Countryman’s Workshop, Phoenix House, 1953
The Shell Book of Country Crafts, John Baker, 1968
The Farm Waggons of England and Wales, John Baker, 1969
All Made by Hand, John Baker, 1970
Farm Waggons and Carts, David & Charles, 1977
All Drawn by Horses, David & Charles, 1979

As illustrator:
Hunter, Norman, Professor Branestawm's Treasure Hunt, John Lane, The Bodley Head, 1937 – Arnold's illustrations were used for the first edition only.
Herring, Maisie. Shropshire, Paul Elek, 1949
Peel, J. H. B. (John Hugh Brignal), The Chilterns, Paul Elek, 1950
Edwards, Tudor. Warwickshire, Paul Elek, 1950

References

External links
London Transport Museum—an example of Arnold's commercial art, page one and page two

1909 births
1999 deaths
British illustrators
British writers